Sir Kenneth Ronald Stowe  (17 July 1927 – 29 August 2015) was a senior British civil servant. He was Principal Private Secretary to the Prime Minister 1975 to 1979, and the Permanent Under-Secretary of State of the Northern Ireland Office 1979 to 1981. From 1981 to 1987 he was Permanent Secretary of the Department of Health and Social Security. He was made a CB in 1977, CVO in 1979, and KCB in 1980 and a GCB in 1986.

Biography
Stowe was born in Dagenham, Essex on 17 July 1927. His father Arthur Percy Stowe was maker of spectacles and his mother was Emmie Louise (Emma), née Webb.

Stowe attended Dagenham County High School and studied history, under a scholarship, at Exeter College, Oxford. On 20 August 1949, Stowe married Joan Frances Randall Cullen, a teacher, in Essex. The couple went on to have two sons and a daughter. He was widowed in 1995

Stowe graduated in 1951, he joined the civil service's National Assistance Board (later to become the Ministry of Social Security), working directly with those people who were asking for help. In 1973, he began employment as under-secretary at the Cabinet Office in the Legislation Committee. When Robert Armstrong retired in 1975, he was recommended to Harold Wilson as Principal Private Secretary to the Prime Minister. He remained in the role for 4 years, serving under Harold Wilson, James Callaghan and for the first few months of Margaret Thatcher's premiership.

Thatcher appointed Stowe as Permanent Under-Secretary of State of the Northern Ireland Office in 1979, where he brokered an agreement during the 1980 hunger strike at Maze prison, although it did not hold. He became permanent secretary for the Department of Health and Social Security in 1981, responsible for over a million individuals in the NHS and social services departments.

After retirement in 1987, Stowe spent a period advising public service reform in Zimbabwe and South Africa, as well as reform programs in the UK. He received multiple honours during his time in the civil service, a CB in 1977, CVO in 1979, and KCB in 1980 and a GCB in 1986.

He spent his later years with his partner Judith Mary Phillips and died at his home in Lingen, Herefordshire on 29 August 2015.

References

External links 
 The Papers of Sir Kenneth Stowe held at Churchill Archives Centre

1927 births
2015 deaths
Permanent Under-Secretaries of State for Northern Ireland
Permanent Under-Secretaries of State for Social Services
Private secretaries in the British Civil Service
Commanders of the Royal Victorian Order
Fellows of Exeter College, Oxford
Knights Grand Cross of the Order of the Bath
Principal Private Secretaries to the Prime Minister